High Noon is the third full-length studio album by Canadian rock band Arkells. It was announced on May 13, 2014, that the album would be released on August 5, 2014. The album sold 5,200 copies in its first week and debuted at #3 on the Canadian Albums Chart. It is the band's highest position on that chart in their history.
By September 2015, High Noon had sold over 40,000 copies and was certified a Gold Record.

The album is a longlisted nominee for the 2015 Polaris Music Prize.

Track listing
All songs written by Arkells.

Personnel 
Arkells

 Max Kerman – lead vocals, guitar
 Micheal DeAngelis – guitar, vocals
 Anthony Carone – keyboards, vocals, strings, arranger
 Nick Dika – bass guitar
 Tim Oxford – drums, percussion

Musicians

 Ernesto Barahona – trombone
 Leland Whitty – tenor saxophone
 Dana Grey – baritone saxophone
 Christine Chesebrough – violin
 Kelly Lefaive – violin
 Emma Vachon-Tweeny – viola
 Igor Saika-Voivod – score, conductor, cello

Technical

 Cameron Lister – recording engineer
 Tony Hoffer – producer, mix engineer
 Eric Ratz – producer, engineer (tracks: 1, 3, 9); mix engineer (tracks: 1, 3, 7, 9)
 Harry Hess – mastering engineer

Art and Management

 Micheal DeAngelis – cover
 Brooks Reynolds – photography
 Tom Sarig – management

References

2014 albums
Arkells albums
Dine Alone Records albums
Universal Music Canada albums
Albums produced by Tony Hoffer
Juno Award for Rock Album of the Year albums